

General election

Legislative Assembly elections

Elections to the State Legislative Assemblies were held in six Indian states during 2004. Four (Andhra Pradesh, Karnataka, Orissa and Sikkim) had assembly election simultaneous with the Lok Sabha elections in April–May. In Maharashtra and Arunachal Pradesh elections were held September–October.

Andhra Pradesh

The elected independents include one member of the Communist Party of India (Marxist-Leninist) New Democracy.

Karnataka

Orissa

Source:ECI

Sikkim

Arunachal Pradesh

Maharashtra

References

External links

 Election Commission of India

2004 elections in India
India
2004 in India
Elections in India by year